Beglik Tash, is a prehistoric rock sanctuary situated on the southern Black Sea coast of Bulgaria, a few kilometers north of the city of Primorsko. It was re-used by the Thracian tribes in the Iron Age.

At the end of the 19th century, the Czech-Bulgarian historian and archaeologist Karel Škorpil produced the first scientific account of the sanctuary, which was then known as Apostol Tash. In 2002, Bulgarian archaeologists started excavations under the supervision of Tsonia Drazheva.

Beglik Tash – an expression whose meaning is probably related to the tax on sheep collected by the Ottoman authorities until 1913, the "beglik", and a Turkish word to describe an area made of large stones, "taşlar" – is a natural rock-formation consisting of megaliths of hardened magma that erupted from a Mesozoic era volcano.

Most of the megaliths have traces of carvings for the purposes of Thracian rituals. There are also the remains of a labyrinth that visitors can pass through. A Thracian sun-clock is formed from huge stones. There is also a 150-ton rock that rests on the ground in only two places, and a "womb-cave".

Archaeologists have found ceramic artefacts from the Early Iron Age (10th–6th century BC), classical antiquity, and the Middle Ages, as well as a man-made stone altar at the end of the natural cave which proves that it was used as a place of worship. Every day at noon, a ray of sunlight enters the narrow entrance of the cave, and projects itself on the back of cave. According to the Bulgarian archaeologist Alexander Fol some of the Thracian womb-caves had the property of letting the sunlight in only at certain times of the day, a natural phenomenon seen by the Thracians as acts of symbolic fertilization of the Earth womb or the Mother Goddess by the sun phallus of the Sun God.

The site is an open-air museum maintained by the Burgas Historical Society. It is visited annually by 40,000 tourists. Beglik Tash is located in the vicinity of two other Thracian sites: the city of Ranuli and the fortress of Pharmakida in the Strandhza mountain.

See also
Thrace
Thracians
Heros (mythology)

Notes

External links

 Pictures of Bulgaria – Beglik Tash
 Thracian sanctuary Beglik Tash
 Archaeology in Bulgaria, 14 March 2016: Ancient Thrace shrine Begli Tash near Bulgaria's Black Sea resort Primorsko attracts over 40,000 visitors annually
 Minka Vazkresenska: Bulgaria's Stonehenge? in Vagabond, Bulgaria's English Monthly, 28 July 2009

Bulgarian Black Sea Coast
Geography of Thrace
Archaeological sites in Bulgaria
Buildings and structures in Burgas Province
Megalithic monuments in Europe
Rock formations of Bulgaria
Landforms of Burgas Province
History of Burgas Province